"Doll" is a Japanese-language song by girl pop rock band Scandal. It was  the major debut single (fourth overall) released by the band, released in two versions: a limited CD+DVD edition and a regular CD-only edition. The title track was used as the October and November 2008 opening theme for TBS's "Rank Oukoku", as well as the October 2008 ending theme for Tokyo MX's "Break Poing". The single reached #26 on the Oricon weekly chart and charted for five weeks, selling 12,572 copies. The DVD includes the karaoke PV for "Doll" with cheers from Scandal. It was certified gold by the RIAJ for selling over 100,000 digital copies in January 2017.

Track listing

CD

DVD

References 

2008 singles
Japanese television drama theme songs
Songs written by Tomomi Ogawa
Scandal (Japanese band) songs
Epic Records singles
2008 songs